Vahelna is a small village in Muzaffarnagar district of Uttar Pradesh, India.

Vahelna Jain Temple

Shri 1008 Parshvnath Digamber Jain Atishye Kshetra popularly known as Vahelna Jain Mandir is a major historical & religious place for Jains.

Sources 

Villages in Muzaffarnagar district
Jain temples in Uttar Pradesh
Colossal Jain statues in India